The National Science Foundation of Sri Lanka (NSF) (Sinhala: ජාතික විද්‍යා පදනම, ශ්‍රී ලංකාව Jathika Vidya Padanama, Shri Lankawa) was established in 1998 as the successor to the Natural Resources Energy & Science Authority of Sri Lanka (NARESA) established in 1981 and the National Science Council set up in 1968.

Objectives
The objectives of the NSF are to initiate, facilitate and support basic and applied scientific research by universities, science and technology institutions and scientists, with a view to:
strengthening scientific research potential, including research in the social sciences, and scientific education programmes
developing the natural resources of Sri Lanka
promoting the welfare of the people of Sri Lanka
training research personnel in science and technology

Divisions
The NSF has the following divisions:
 Research Division
 Technology Division
 Science & Technology Policy Research Division
 Science Popularisation Division
 International Liaison Division
 National Science Library & Resource Centre

It also maintains the National Science Foundation of Sri Lanka Digital Repository, a digital library and open access repository.

External links 
 

Scientific organisations based in Sri Lanka
Members of the International Council for Science
1998 establishments in Sri Lanka
Scientific organizations established in 1998
Members of the International Science Council